Beta is a winter-hardy variety of North American grape derived from a cross of the Vitis labrusca-based cultivar Concord and a selection of Vitis riparia, the wild riverbank grape, called Carver. It is an extremely cold-hardy grape that is self-fertile. This variety is grown successfully in Finland and was widely planted in Minnesota in the early 20th century. It ripens in late September in New York State. It bears dark, blue-black fruit that is used for jellies, fruit juices, etc. but rarely for wine.

History
Beta was released by Louis Suelter, and named for his wife. Because of this, the proper pronunciation is actually "Bett-uh", but the name is more commonly assumed to follow the pronunciation of the Greek letter. Suelter released a number of other cultivars from the same cross, including the equally hardy Suelter grape.

References

Table grape varieties
Hybrid grape varieties